Charles Lupiya (born 18 May 1953) is a Zambian sprinter. He competed in the men's 400 metres at the 1980 Summer Olympics.

References

1953 births
Living people
Athletes (track and field) at the 1980 Summer Olympics
Zambian male sprinters
Olympic athletes of Zambia
Athletes (track and field) at the 1974 British Commonwealth Games
Athletes (track and field) at the 1982 Commonwealth Games
Commonwealth Games competitors for Zambia
Place of birth missing (living people)